Hetton railway station served the town of Hetton-le-Hole, Tyne and Wear, England, from 1837 to 1963 on the Durham and Sunderland Railway.

History 
The station opened on 6 November 1837 on the Durham and Sunderland Railway. It was situated on the west side of Station Road. It closed to passengers on 5 January 1953 and closed to goods on 11 November 1963. It is now a cycle path that runs between Barrow-in-Furness and Sunderland.

References

External links 

Disused railway stations in Tyne and Wear
Railway stations in Great Britain opened in 1837
Railway stations in Great Britain closed in 1963
1837 establishments in England
1963 disestablishments in England